The 2015–16 Oklahoma State Cowboys basketball team represented Oklahoma State University in the 2015–16 NCAA Division I men's basketball season. This was head coach Travis Ford's eighth and final season at Oklahoma State. The Cowboys were members of the Big 12 Conference and played their home games at Gallagher-Iba Arena. They finished the season 12–20, 3–15 in Big 12 play to finish in ninth place. They lost in the first round of the Big 12 tournament to Kansas State.

On March 18, Oklahoma State and Travis Ford mutually parted ways. He finished at OSU with an eight-year record of 155–111.

Previous season 
The Cowboys finished the season 18–14, 8–10 in Big 12 play to finish in a three-way tie for sixth place. They lost in the quarterfinals of the Big 12 tournament to Oklahoma. They received an at-large bid to the NCAA tournament where they lost in second round to Oregon.

Departures

Incoming Transfers

Recruits

Recruiting Class of 2016

Roster

Schedule and results

|-
!colspan=9 style="background:#000000; color:#FF6600;"| Exhibition

|-
!colspan=9 style="background:#000000; color:#FF6600;"| Regular season

|-
!colspan=9 style="background:#000000; color:#FF6600;"| Big 12 tournament

CSN = Cowboy Sports Network. The Cowboy Sports Network is affiliated with Fox Sports Net. Games could air on Fox Sports Oklahoma, Fox Sports Oklahoma Plus, Fox Sports Southwest, Fox Sports Southwest Plus, or Fox College Sports.

References

Oklahoma State Cowboys basketball seasons
Oklahoma State
Oklahoma State Cowboys bask
Oklahoma State Cowboys bask